Lev Nitikin (1926 – 3 April 1989) was a Soviet sprint canoer who competed in the early 1950s. At the 1952 Summer Olympics in Helsinki, he finished eighth in the K-1 1000 m event.

References

Lev Nikitin's profile at Sports Reference.com

1926 births
1989 deaths
Canoeists at the 1952 Summer Olympics
Olympic canoeists of the Soviet Union
Soviet male canoeists
Russian male canoeists